The Journal of the Gilded Age and Progressive Era is a peer-reviewed academic journal of American history. It is sometimes referred to by the acronym JGAPE.

Quarterly journal
The journal publishes scholarly articles and book reviews relating to the period between 1865 and 1920 in the United States. This range covers the eras of American history referred to by historians as the Gilded Age and the Progressive Era. The journal is published quarterly by the Society for Historians of the Gilded Age and Progressive Era and the Rutherford B. Hayes Presidential Center.

The journal is published for the Society for Historians of the Gilded Age and Progressive Era by Cambridge Journals.

References

External links
Journal of the Gilded Age and Progressive Era
Rutherford B. Hayes Presidential Center

History of the United States journals
Gilded Age
Progressive Era in the United States
Publications established in 2002
English-language journals
Quarterly journals
Cambridge University Press academic journals